Yona is a 2014 Israeli drama film directed by Nir Bergman. It was nominated for the Ophir Award for Best Film.

Cast
 Naomi Levov
 Michael Moshonov

References

External links
 

2014 films
2014 drama films
Israeli drama films
2010s Hebrew-language films